Chester Miller (July 19, 1902 – May 15, 1953) was an American racecar driver. He was killed in a crash in the south turn of the Indianapolis Motor Speedway during practice for the 1953 Indianapolis 500. During his long Indy career, Miller earned the nickname "Dean of the Speedway."

He died at age 50 while driving a Novi-engined Special. He is interred at Crown Hill Cemetery in Indianapolis.

Indianapolis 500 results

Although Miller posted the fastest qualifying time for the 1952 Indianapolis 500, he started on the outside of the ninth row. No other fastest qualifier has started this far back in the field.

Complete Formula One World Championship results
(key) (Races in italics indicate fastest lap)

World Championship career summary
Although run to a completely different set of rules, the Indianapolis 500 was part of the FIA Formula One World Championship from 1950 through 1960. Drivers competing at Indy during those years were credited with World Championship points and participation. Chet Miller participated in 2 World Championship races - the 1951 and 1952 Indianapolis 500. He retired from both races, and therefore scored no championship points.

With his death during practice for the 1953 Indianapolis 500, Miller became the first driver to die as a result of a crash during a World Championship event, and the second driver to die either in a Formula One car or at a World Championship event, after Englishman Cameron Earl had died 11 months earlier while testing an ERA Formula One car at the MIRA proving ground in England.

References 

Indianapolis 500 drivers
Racing drivers who died while racing
1902 births
1953 deaths
Racing drivers from Detroit
Sports deaths in Indiana
AAA Championship Car drivers
Burials at Crown Hill Cemetery